Discelium is the only genus of moss in the family Disceliaceae; it contains the single species Discelium nudum, the flag-moss.  This species is rare, but is widely distributed in cool and temperate climates of the Northern Hemisphere.

References

Bryopsida
Monotypic moss genera